Novi Yarylovychi is a border crossing between Belarus and Ukraine, just north of village of Novi Yarylovychi, Chernihiv Raion, Chernihiv Oblast.

Overview
Named after village of Novi Yarylovychi that is located nearby, the checkpoint is actually located right next to smaller village Skytok.

Across the border on the Belarusian side is a border checkpoint Nova Huta.

The type of crossing is automobile, status - international. The types of transportation for automobile crossings are passenger and freight.

The port of entry is part of the Novi Yarylovychi customs post of Chernihiv customs.

See also
 State border of Ukraine

References

External links
 State Border Guard of Ukraine website 

Belarus–Ukraine border crossings
Geography of Chernihiv Oblast